Monster War may refer to:

Monster War Online by Oscar Chu
Monster War (comics) a series from Dynamite Entertainment